A kufi or kufi cap is a brimless, short, and rounded cap worn by men in many populations in North Africa, East Africa, West Africa, and South Asia. It is also worn by men throughout the African diaspora. It is also commonly called a "topi" or "tupi" in the Indian subcontinent.

African and African-American usage
In West Africa, a kufi cap is the traditional hat for men, and is part of the national costume of most of the countries in the region. It is worn by Muslims, and African Christians. Many grandfathers and other older men wear a kufi every day to symbolize their status as wise elders, religious people, or family patriarchs.

Within the United States, it has become identified primarily with persons of West African heritage, who wear it to show pride in their culture, history, and religion (whether Christianity, Islam, or Traditional African religions). It is often made of kente cloth, mudcloth, or knitted or crocheted in a variety of yarns.

Crown style kufis are the traditional hat worn with formal West African attire. A formal dashiki suit will always include a crown style kufi, while the knitted style is most appropriate for non-formal occasions. Other caps worn with the dashiki, Senegalese kaftan, and grand boubou, include:

 The aso oke hat, or fila, from Nigeria 
 The fez, or tarboosh, a wool cap with a stem from North Africa and Turkiye
 The abeti-aja, a triangular Yoruba hat, whose name means "like the ears of a dog", from Nigeria

However, the crown style kufi is most common.

In the United States today, many African-Americans wear the kufi during weddings, funerals, graduations and Kwanzaa celebrations. Furthermore, people of mainly West African heritage of all faiths wear the kufi, although it is associated more with members of the Islamic faith.

A West African king or tribal chief may have royal or noble arms embroidered on the kufi.

For members of the Christian faith, the kufi is unisex, and is also worn by women.  Crochet and knitted styles are preferred by young girls and infants.

Traditionally, when worn by men, the kufi is a sign of peace, mourning, renewal or protection of the mind.

Etymology
In the Yoruba language, Ade means crown, and fila means cap. The city of Kufi is located in Yorubaland near Ibadan. Other West African names include fula, fila, and malo hat. This cap is called a kofia in the Swahili language of East Africa (see the kanzu article for further information). In the United States, the West African name, kufi, is most commonly used.

International use 

Jazz rock/jazz fusion Weather Report frontman and keyboardist Joe Zawinul had been longtime wearing kufi, both on stage with the band and outside of it, in his private/personal life. He is known for having changed various kufi models throughout the passing of time as well, as shown in the live performances of Weather Report from the 1970s and 1980s. Progressive rock Dutch legend Thijs van Leer also worn kufi caps during his early career with the band in the 1970s. He can be seen wearing one in the music video for House of the King (also the theme song for the British TV show Saxondale).

Rush drummer Neil Peart took to wearing a kufi during performances after a touring Cameroon by bicycle in 1988. 

The caps were featured on dancers in the 2018 music video All the Stars by the artist Kendrick Lamar.

See also

 List of hats
 Smoking cap
 Women's wrapper and kaftan

References

Further reading
 Thony C. Anyiam, Jumping the Broom in Style (Authorhouse 2007).
 Diane Hoyt-Goldsmith, Celebrating Kwanzaa (Holiday House 1993).

External links 

 

African clothing
African-American culture
Caps
Hats